Patrick Reynolds Mitchell KCVO (17 March 1930 – 23 January 2020) was an English Anglican priest.

Life
Mitchell was born on 17 March 1930 and educated at Eton, Merton College, Oxford., and Wells Theological College. Ordained in 1955  he began his ecclesiastical career with a curacy at St. Mark's Church, Mansfield following which he was Priest-Vicar of Wells Cathedral.

Mitchell would go on to hold incumbencies in Milton, Portsmouth and  Frome Selwood, Somerset before being appointed Dean of Wells in 1973, a position he held for 16 years; during his deanship he oversaw a major restoration of the cathedral. In 1981, he was appointed to the Cathedrals Advisory Commission for England. In 1989, he became Dean of Windsor until his retirement eight years later, when he was appointed a Knight Commander of the Royal Victorian Order (KCVO).

He died in January 2020 at the age of 89.

References

1930 births
2020 deaths
People educated at Eton College
Alumni of Merton College, Oxford
Deans of Wells
Deans of Windsor
Knights Commander of the Royal Victorian Order